The 1981 Northern Illinois Huskies football team represented Northern Illinois University as a member of the Mid-American Conference (MAC) during 1981 NCAA Division I-A football season. Led by second-year head coach Bill Mallory, the Huskies compiled an overall record of 3–8 with a mark of 2–7 in conference play, placing ninth in the MAC. Northern Illinois played home games at Huskie Stadium in DeKalb, Illinois.

Schedule

References

Northern Illinois
Northern Illinois Huskies football seasons
Northern Illinois Huskies football